Phyllodactylus andysabini, also known commonly as Andy Sabin's leaf-toed gecko or the Wolf Volcano leaf-toed gecko, is a species of lizard in the family Phyllodactylidae. The species is endemic to Isabela Island in the Galápagos Islands.

References

Phyllodactylus
Reptiles described in 2019